Kim Clijsters defeated Maria Sharapova in the final, 6–3, 7–5 to win the women's singles title at the 2005 Miami Open. She did not lose a set during the tournament, and became the second woman to achieve the Sunshine Double (after Steffi Graf). Clijsters became the lowest-ranked player to win the title, doing so as the world No. 38.

Serena Williams was the three-time defending champion, but lost in the quarterfinals to her sister Venus.

Seeds
All seeds received a bye into the second round.

Draw

Finals

Top half

Section 1

Section 2

Section 3

Section 4

Bottom half

Section 5

Section 6

Section 7

Section 8

Qualifying

Seeds

Qualifiers

Lucky loser
  Stéphanie Cohen-Aloro

Qualifying draw

First qualifier

Second qualifier

Third qualifier

Fourth qualifier

Fifth qualifier

Sixth qualifier

Seventh qualifier

Eighth qualifier

Ninth qualifier

Tenth qualifier

Eleventh qualifier

Twelfth qualifier

References

External links
 Official results archive (ITF)
 Official results archive (WTA)

Women's Singles
2005 WTA Tour